Schwanengesang (Swan Song),  957, is a collection of 14 songs written by Franz Schubert at the end of his life and published posthumously:
 Liebesbotschaft (text: Ludwig Rellstab)
 Kriegers Ahnung (Rellstab)
 Frühlingssehnsucht (Rellstab)
 Ständchen (Rellstab)
 Aufenthalt (Rellstab)
 In der Ferne (Rellstab)
 Abschied (Rellstab)
 Der Atlas (Heinrich Heine)
 Ihr Bild (Heine)
 Das Fischermädchen (Heine)
 Die Stadt (Heine)
 Am Meer (Heine)
 Der Doppelgänger (Heine)
 Die Taubenpost (alternative: D 965a) (Johann Gabriel Seidl)

Background
Named by its first publisher, Tobias Haslinger, who presumably wished to present it as Schubert's last testament, Schwanengesang differs from the earlier Die schöne Müllerin and Winterreise song-cycles by including settings of more than one poet. Seven texts by Ludwig Rellstab (1799–1860) are followed by six by Heinrich Heine (1797–1856); inclusion of the last song, to words by Johann Gabriel Seidl (1804–1875), may or may not reflect Schubert's wishes. In any case, all 14 songs were composed in 1828 and the collection was published in 1829, a few months after the composer's death.

Composition and publication
The Rellstab and Heine settings were copied in a single sitting on consecutive pages of the manuscript in Schubert's hand, and Seidl's Die Taubenpost is considered to be Schubert's last Lied — thus the basis for Haslinger's sequence, one accepted by posterity together with his conceit that a cycle exists at all. (The true cycles Die schöne Müllerin and Die Winterreise had sold well, motivating the publisher.) The title Schwanengesang is not of course the composer's but all the song titles are; Heine, for one, did not name his poems.

An uncertain cycle
On 2 October 1828, after the manuscript had been written, Schubert offered the Heine set of six songs to a Leipzig publisher by the name of Probst. We can assume, then, that Schubert, at least in the beginning, intended two separate single-poet collections. Furthermore the order of Nos. 8–13, as they appear in the manuscript, differs from that of the poems as Heine published them: 10, 12, 11, 13, 9, 8, which in any case were not consecutive, as the table below shows. It was customary for Schubert to respect the poet's sequence; the manuscript may not represent Schubert's desired order. The Seidl song, "Die Taubenpost", has no connection to the rest of the cycle and was appended by Haslinger at the end to round up all of Schubert's last compositions.

The songs
The songs of Schwanengesang as found in Schubert's manuscript:

Another Schwanengesang
Schubert had earlier in his career set to music a single poem titled Schwanengesang, his D 744, by Johann Senn.

Liszt transcriptions
Franz Liszt later transcribed the entire set for solo piano. While staying faithful to Schubert's original, he often changes the piano texture as a way of providing a personal commentary on the text and music. Liszt reordered the songs in the following way: 11, 10, 5, 12, 7, 6, 4, 9, 3, 1, 8, 13, 14 and 2.

See also
List of songs by Franz Schubert
List of compositions by Franz Schubert

References

External links

Comprehensive research website, Iain C. Phillips
Schwanengesang songtexts and translations

 Performance of Schwanengesang by Randall Scarlata (baritone) and Benjamin Hochman (piano) from the Isabella Stewart Gardner Museum in MP3 format
 Autograph manuscript - at The Morgan Library & Museum

Lieder composed by Franz Schubert
Compositions by Franz Schubert published posthumously
Musical settings of poems by Heinrich Heine
Song cycles by Franz Schubert
Classical song cycles in German